Cwmbrwyno is a hamlet in the community of Melindwr, Ceredigion, Wales, which is 71.2 miles (114.7 km) from Cardiff and 172.3 miles (277.3 km) from London. Cwmbrwyno is represented in the Senedd by Elin Jones (Plaid Cymru) and is part of the Ceredigion constituency in the House of Commons.

There are former mines nearby.

References

See also 
 Mwyngloddfa Cwmbrwyno - a Site of Special Scientific Interest nearby
 List of localities in Wales by population 

Villages in Ceredigion